The American Idols Live! Tour 2009 was a summer concert tour in the United States and Canada that featured the top 10 contestants of the eighth season of American Idol. The 52 date tour started on July 5, 2009 in Portland, Oregon and ended on September 15, 2009 in Manchester, New Hampshire.

Performers

Setlist

Michael Sarver - "In Love with a Girl" (Gavin DeGraw), "Closer" (Ne-Yo)
Megan Joy - "Put Your Records On" (Corinne Bailey Rae), "Tears Dry on Their Own" (Amy Winehouse)
Scott MacIntyre - "Bend and Break" (Keane), "A Thousand Miles" (Vanessa Carlton)
Lil Rounds - "Be Without You"/"Just Fine" (Mary J. Blige), "No One" (Alicia Keys) and  "Single Ladies (Put a Ring on It)" (Beyoncé Knowles)
Anoop Desai - "Always on My Mind" (Willie Nelson), "Mad" (Ne-Yo) and "My Prerogative" (Bobby Brown)
Matt Giraud - "Hard to Handle" (Otis Redding/The Black Crowes), "Georgia on My Mind" (Ray Charles) and "You Found Me" (The Fray)
Group medley - Megan & Lil "Can't Take My Eyes off You" (Frankie Valli), Matt & Scott "Tell Her About It" (Billy Joel), Michael & Anoop "Suspicious Minds" (Elvis Presley), Anoop, Matt, Lil, Scott, Megan & Michael "Beggin'", (The Four Seasons/Madcon)

Intermission

Allison Iraheta - "So What" (Pink), "Cry Baby" (Janis Joplin), "Barracuda" (Heart)
Danny Gokey - "P.Y.T. (Pretty Young Thing)" (Michael Jackson), "Maria Maria" (Santana), "What Hurts the Most" (Rascal Flatts), "My Wish" (Rascal Flatts)
Adam Lambert - "Whole Lotta Love" (Led Zeppelin), "Starlight" (Muse), "Mad World" (Tears for Fears), "Slow Ride" with Allison Iraheta (Foghat), David Bowie medley ("Life on Mars?"/"Fame"/"Let's Dance")
Kris Allen - "Heartless" (Kanye West), "All These Things That I've Done" (The Killers), "Bright Lights" (Matchbox Twenty), "Ain't No Sunshine" (Bill Withers), "Hey Jude" (The Beatles)
Top 10 Group song  - "Don't Stop Believin'" (Journey), "Na Na Hey Hey Kiss Him Goodbye" (Steam / Bananarama)

Additional notes
"No Boundaries" was dropped from Kris Allen's set starting on July 10, 2009 in Sacramento, California due to "poor audience response." The song was replaced with "All These Things That I've Done" by The Killers. 
Megan Joy did not perform the last group song in Los Angeles, California on July 16, 2009 due to food poisoning and being sent to the hospital shortly after her set but she did return for the rest of the tour after her recovery.

Tour dates

Nominations
The tour was nominated for a Teen Choice Award in the "Choice Music: Tour" category.

Response
The eighth season tour equaled in its success to the seventh season tour. Despite a slightly lower number of total tickets sold at 484,434, it averaged slightly higher in attendance percentage capacity and yielded a higher gross of $30,139,328 million. It was ranked number 28 in Pollstar's year end list of North American tours.

References

American Idol concert tours
2009 concert tours
Adam Lambert concert tours
Kris Allen